Tectocoris diophthalmus, commonly known as the hibiscus harlequin bug or cotton harlequin bug, is the sole member of the genus Tectocoris. It is a brightly coloured convex and rounded shield-shaped bug with a metallic sheen that grows to about 20 mm. Adult females are mostly orange and males are both blue and red or orange, while nymphs are typically metallic green and purple. The colours are quite variable, and experiments suggest that the variation in colour may reduce bird predation, especially on the immature stages. This extreme level of variation is such that different taxonomists have, since 1781, described this species under different new names at least 16 times, some of these supernumerary names remaining in use until 2006, when it was finally confirmed that they were all colour forms of a single organism. It is common in Eastern Australia, New Guinea and several Pacific Islands in habitats ranging from urban to agricultural and coastal areas.

Hibiscus harlequin bugs feed on many species of the family Malvaceae, as well as cultivated cotton. They will also feed on Illawarra flame tree flowers, grevillea and bottlebrush saplings.

They pierce the stems of young shoots and suck the sap. Females lay clusters of eggs around stems of usually the hibiscus plant and then guards them until they hatch.

Gallery

Footnotes

References
 Queensland Museum (2000). Wildlife of Tropical North Queensland. ,

External links
 OzAnimals.com Australian Wildlife 
 Excellent photos - showing colour variations and mating. 

Insects of Australia
Scutelleridae
Insects described in 1783